Béla Csécsei (12 October 1952 – 31 December 2012) was a Hungarian educator and politician, who served as Mayor of Józsefváros (8th district of Budapest) from 2 February 1993 to 2 September 2009.

References

1952 births
2012 deaths
Hungarian educators
Alliance of Free Democrats politicians
Mayors of places in Hungary
Politicians from Budapest